The Greseuse Formation is a geologic formation in France. It preserves fossils dating back to the Ordovician period.

See also

 List of fossiliferous stratigraphic units in France

References
 

Geologic formations of France
Ordovician System of Europe
Ordovician France
Ordovician south paleopolar deposits